Randy Vancourt is a Canadian composer and entertainer. A Juno Award nominated composer, he has written music for television series such as Man Alive, Hello Mrs. Cherrywinkle, Carmen SanDiego and Dudley the Dragon.

He is also a writer of stage musicals including Chutzpah a Go-Go, Born Lucky, Boardwalk!  and The Rocky Road To Dublin.

His recordings have received international airplay, with his Radio Freaks  songs appearing on the syndicated Dr. Demento radio show.

He is a founding member of the comedy troupe Radio Freaks who appeared for three years on CIUT Radio.

Randy is the son of author A. Lawrence Vaincourt, famous for his popular poem Just A Common Soldier.

Works
 Forever For Now (1992)
 Chutzpah a Go-Go (1993)
 Boardwalk! (2007)
 Smashed (2008)
 Born Lucky (2008)
 The Rocky Road To Dublin (2010)
 The Bonnie Banks (2012)
 Bring The Piano (2016)
 Tuned (2018)

References

External links
 
 RandyVancourt.com
 Boardwalk! The Doo Wop Musical
 Born Lucky
 Radio Freaks Comedy Show
 Chutzpah à Go-Go

Canadian musical theatre composers
Living people
Canadian comedy musicians
Year of birth missing (living people)